Australia legally has no official language. However, English is by far the most commonly spoken and has been entrenched as the de facto national language since European settlement. Australian English is a major variety of the English language with a distinctive pronunciation and lexicon, and differs slightly from other varieties of English in grammar and spelling. General

According to the 2021 census, English is the only language spoken in the home for 72% of the population. The ten next most common languages spoken at home are: Mandarin (2.7%), Arabic (1.4%), Vietnamese (1.3%), Cantonese (1.2%), Punjabi (0.9%), Greek (0.9%), Italian (0.9%), Tagalog (0.9%), Hindi (0.8%) and Spanish (0.7%). A considerable proportion of first- and second-generation immigrants are bilingual or even multilingual.

In 2018, it was reported that one million people in Australia could not speak English.

Over two hundred and fifty Indigenous Australian languages are thought to have existed at the time of first European contact, of which fewer than twenty are still in modern daily use by all age groups. About 110 others are spoken exclusively by older people. At the time of the 2006 census, 52,000 Indigenous Australians, representing 12% of the Indigenous population, reported that they spoke an Indigenous language at home.

On Norfolk Island, the Norfuk language has official status.

Australia is home to many sign languages, the most widespread of which is known as Auslan, which is the main language of about 5,500 people. Other sign languages include the various manual Indigenous languages like Eltye eltyarrenke, Rdaka-rdaka and Yolŋu Sign Language. Lastly, there is a small community of people who speak Australian Irish Sign Language (AISL), a Francosign language related to French Sign Language rather than being a Banzsl language like Auslan.

English language

Rates of English language as most common languages spoken at home are in 2021, 2016 and 2011:
Tasmania (86.1% 2021) (88.3% 2016) (91.7% 2011)
Queensland (80.5% 2021) (81.2% 2016) (84.8% 2011)
South Australia (77.6% 2021) (78.2% 2016) (81.6% 2011)
Western Australia (75.3% 2021) (75.2% 2016) (79.3% 2011)
Australian Capital Territory (71.3% 2021) (72.7% 2016) (77.8% 2011)
New South Wales (67.6% 2021) (68.5% 2016) (72.5% 2011)
Victoria (67.2% 2021) (67.9% 2016) (72.4% 2011)
Northern Territory (57.3% 2021) (58.0% 2016) (62.8% 2011)

Aboriginal languages

It is believed that there were almost 400 Australian Aboriginal and Torres Strait languages at the time of first European contact. Most of these are now either extinct or moribund, with only about fifteen languages still being spoken among all age groups of the relevant tribes. The National Indigenous Languages Report is a regular Australia-wide survey of the status of Aboriginal and Torres Strait Islander languages conducted in 2005, 2014 and 2019. An indigenous language remains the main language for about 50,000 (0.25%) people.

The Aboriginal and Torres Strait Island languages with the most speakers today are Upper Arrernte, Kalaw Lagaw Ya, Tiwi, Walmajarri, Warlpiri, and the Western Desert language.

Sign languages

Tasmanian languages

Torres Strait languages

Two languages are spoken on the islands of the Torres Strait, within Australian territory, by the Melanesian inhabitants of the area: Kalaw Lagaw Ya and Meriam. Meriam Mir is a Papuan language, while Kalaw Lagaw Ya is an Australian language.

Pidgins and creoles
Two English-based creoles have arisen in Australia after European contact: Kriol and Torres Strait Creole. Kriol is spoken in the Northern Territory and Western Australia, and Torres Strait Creole in Queensland and south-west Papua.

Broome Pearling Lugger Pidgin was a pidgin used as a lingua franca between Malays, Japanese, Vietnamese, Torres Strait Islanders and Aborigines on pearling boats.

Angloromani is a mixture of Romani and Australian English. It is spoken by the Romani minority in Australia.

Immigrant languages

There has been a steady decline in the percentage of Australians who speak only English at home since at least 2001. According to the 2001 census, English was the only language spoken in the home for around 80% of the population.  By the 2006 census it had fallen to  close to 79%, while in the 2011 census, that number had fallen to 76.8%. According to the 2021 census, English is the only language spoken at home for 72% of the population. Languages Other Than English (LOTE) is becoming an increasingly popular subject in Australian schools, and English as a Second Language (ESL) is an alternative, less advanced English subject for newly immigrated students.

The next five most common languages spoken at home, as of the 2016 census, are:
Mandarin (2.7%)
Arabic (1.4%)
Vietnamese (1.3%)
Cantonese (1.2%)
Punjabi (0.9%) 

A considerable proportion of first- and second-generation migrants are bilingual.

Foreign languages 

Foreign languages are widely taught in Australia. The most popular languages taught at schools other than English are Japanese, Italian, Indonesian, French, German and Mandarin. However, many other languages are also taught at schools, including other foreign languages, Indigenous Australian languages and Auslan.

See also 
 Diminutives in Australian English

References

Citations

Sources 

 McConvell, P. & Thieberger, N. (2001). [State of Indigenous Language Report http://repository.unimelb.edu.au/10187/485].

External links

 Ethnologue report for Australia
 Census Data (Australian government)
Tamil Australians

 
Australian culture